Sandra May Barwick  (born 1949) is a New Zealand ultramarathon runner who set a new six-day track world record in Campbelltown, Australia, 18–24 November 1990. Covering 549 miles 110 yards in six days, Barwick set a record that still stands today.

In the 1994 Queen's Birthday Honours, Barwick was appointed a Member of the Order of the British Empire, for services to athletics.

Career highlights
Sandy Barwick set these world records.
 Track: 6 day 883.631 km, Campbelltown, Australia, December 1990
 Road: 1000 km 7 days 16 hour 11 minutes
 2000 km 17 days 3 hours 1 minute
 1000 miles 12 days 14 hours 38 minutes 40 sec
 1300 miles 17 days 22 hours 46 minutes 07 sec
(All road records were set at the Sri Chinmoy 1300 mile multiday race in New York, 16 September – 3 October 1991.)

References

External links
 DUV - International Yearly Rankings

New Zealand ultramarathon runners
Living people
1949 births
New Zealand female long-distance runners
New Zealand Members of the Order of the British Empire
Female ultramarathon runners